The Blue Whisper, is a 2022 Chinese television series starring  Dilraba Dilmurat and Ren Jialun. It is based on the xuanhuan romance novel The Tale of the Merman by Jiulu Feixiang.
It aired from March 17, 2022, to May 18, 2022. The series was divided into two parts: Part 1 aired from March 17 to April 1, 2022, for 22 episodes, while Part 2 aired from  April 4, 2022, to May 18, 2022, for 20 episodes.

Cast and characters

Main
Dilraba Dilmurat as Ji Yunhe / Ah Ji (voiced by Qiao Shiyu)
Kristina as Ji Yunhe / Ah Ji (young)
 Spiritual master and guardian of Flower Valley
Ren Jialun as Chang Yi (voiced by Zhang Jie)
 A merman from East Sea who was captured by Fairy Shunde

Flower Valley
Xiao Shunyao as Lin Haoqing
Xiao Tianren as Lin Haoqing (young)
 Young master of Flower Valley
Hai Yitian as Lin Canglan
 Master of Flower Valley
Hu Yixuan as Luo Jinsang
 Ji Yunhe's good friend and attendant. A butterfly spirit
Fan Zhen as Xue Sanyue
 Protector of Flower Valley. Ji Yunhe's ally
Ci Sha as Li Shu
 Xue Sanyue's attendant and lover. A mountain cat spirit
Wang Junhao as Qu Xiaoxing
 Commander of the armed forces. Ji Yunhe's good friend and Lin Haoqing's trusted subordinate
Lu Yanbei as Qing Shu, Lin Canglan's attendant
Chen Guanhong as Siyu, Lin Haoqing's attendant
Guo Xiaoting as Ning Xiyu
 Former master of Flower Valley. Ning Qing and Ning Ruochu's master
Fu Jun as Elder Dong Lian
Liu Guanghou as Elder Mu Ze
Yu Qinghui as Elder Liu Ying

Immortal Master Mansion
Wang Dong as Ning Qing, immortal master 
Zhang Yuxuan as Ning Qing (young)
Guo Xiaoting as Fairy Shunde / Ru Ling, elder sister of the Heavenly Emperor and disciple of Ning Qing
Li Junxian as Ji Chengyu, disciple of Ning Qing
Yang Jiahua as Ji Ning, disciple of Ning Qing
Yu Miao Xin as Envoy Zhang, Fairy Shunde's subordinate
Wang Shanzhui as Zhu Ling, head of Ling Shuang tower. Fairy Shunde's subordinate

North Abyss

Qing Qiu Fox Tribe
Fu Hongsheng as Qing Xuan, king of the Qing Qiu Fox Tribe
Wang Yifei as Qing Yao, heiress of the Qing Qiu Fox Tribe
Sun Chuhong as Qi Feng, Qing Yao's cousin
Wang Jie as Wei Yan, Qing Yao's attendant

Others
Wang Ziteng as Kong Ming, a wandering immortal who was a part of the Immortal Master Mansion
Li Baoer as Luo Suo, Chang Yi's subordinate

Heaven Realm
He Yuxiao as Ru Jun, the Heavenly Emperor
Tan Kai as Immortal Lord Si Fang
Zhang Xilin as Immortal Lord He Xu, advisor of the Heavenly Emperor, in charge of mapping the constellations
Bai Haitao as Immortal Lord Fei Lian, subordinate of the Heavenly Emperor
Mao Fan as Immortal Lord Lei Ze, subordinate of the Heavenly Emperor

Others
He Zhonghua as Merman King, Chang Yi's father
He Yongsheng as Li Shu's grandfather
Wang Zun as Da Huan, Li Shu's subordinate
Jiang Xiao Lin as Xiao Huan, Li Shu's subordinate
Tong Lei as Qing Ji, Ning Ruochu's lover
Zheng Guolin as Ning Ruochu, former spiritual master of Flower Valley, Qing Ji's lover
Zhang Zi Han as Ning Ruochu (young)
Sa Dingding as Gu Huo Bird
Liu Xiangge as Duo Duo
Yan Lang as Feng Li
Yan Linfei as Lu Jinyan

Production
Filming of the drama began in Hengdian World Studios on February 16, 2021. The opening ceremony was held on the February 18, and the whole drama shooting was completed on June 6, 2021. On April 15, 2021, main characters of the drama, Dilraba Dilmurat and Ren Jialun jointly attended the 2021 Youku Annual Press Conference to promote the series.

Soundtrack
The Blue Whisper OST (驭鲛记 原声大碟) consisted of 5 tracks, sung by various artists.

References

External links

2020s Chinese television series debuts
2022 Chinese television series debuts
2022 Chinese television series endings
Chinese romantic fantasy television series
Chinese fantasy television series
Chinese romance television series
Television shows based on Chinese novels
Chinese novels adapted into television series
Youku original programming